Laevityphis libos is a species of sea snail, a marine gastropod mollusk, in the family Muricidae, the murex snails or rock snails.

Description
The length of the shell attains 8.2 mm.

Distribution
This species is found in Papua New Guinea.

References

libos
Gastropods described in 2017